Lagrange's identity may refer to:
 Lagrange's identity, an algebraic  identity
 Lagrange's identity (boundary value problem), an identity in calculus
 Lagrange's trigonometric identities, two trigonometric identities
 Lagrange's four-square theorem, a theorem from number theory
 Lagrange polynomial for theorems relating to numerical interpolation
 Euler–Lagrange equation of variational mechanics